Rf factor may refer to:

Chemistry
Retardation factor, a variable measured in chromatography

Biology
Rheumatoid factor, an autoantibody commonly associated with rheumatoid arthritis